Estadio Elías Figueroa Brander, formerly known as Estadio Regional Chiledeportes and Estadio Municipal de Valparaíso, is a multi-purpose stadium in Valparaíso, Chile.  It is commonly known as Estadio Playa Ancha, due to the suburb where it is located. It is currently used mostly for football matches and is the home stadium of Santiago Wanderers.  The stadium holds 20,575, was built in 1931 and renovated in 2014.

The highest attendance at the Elías Figueroa, then "Municipal de Valparaiso", was 23,109 for a Primera Division league match between Santiago Wanderers and Colo-Colo (0-2) on October 25, 1953.

In July 2022, the venue was confirmed to host the women's football tournament at the 2023 Pan American Games.

References 

Elias Figueroa Brander
Elias Figueroa Brander
Copa América stadiums
Multi-purpose stadiums in Chile
Sports venues completed in 1931
Venues of the 2023 Pan and Parapan American Games